Dallaire is a surname. Notable people with the surname include:
Roméo Dallaire, Canadian humanitarian, author and retired senator and general
Jean Dallaire, Canadian painter 
Hector Dallaire, a Canadian professional ice hockey player
André Dallaire, a Canadian attempted assassin 

French-language surnames